Carnoy is a former commune in the Somme department in Hauts-de-France in northern France. On 1 January 2019, it was merged into the new commune Carnoy-Mametz.

Geography

Population

History
In the First World War, the area was the site of heavy fighting, particularly during the Battle of the Somme. It was also one of the sites where large British mines were exploded on the first day that battle.

See also
Communes of the Somme department

References

Former communes of Somme (department)
Populated places disestablished in 2019